UWE (UML-based Web Engineering) is a software engineering approach for the development of Web applications. UWE provides a UML profile (UML extension), a metamodel, model-driven development process and tool support for the systematic design of Web applications (MagicUWE). UWE follows the separation of concerns building separate models for requirements, content, navigation, presentation, process, adaptation and architecture.

The key aspects that distinguish UWE are reliance on OMG standards.

Other possibilities
 WebML (Web Modeling Language)
 HDM
 RMM
 EORM
 OOHDM
 WSDM
 Araneus
 OO-H
 UML WAE
 Hera

See also
 Web engineering
 Web modeling

External links
 UWE site

Web development software